The Menstad conflict or  "The Menstad battle" was a Norwegian policing and political débâcle on 8 June 1931 at Norsk Hydro's Menstad plant, near Skien in the Norwegian province of Telemark.

Since March, Norway had been feeling significant industrial tension as the full effects of the Great Depression began to be felt in Norway. It was in this atmosphere that the Norwegian Employers' Confederation (NAF) announced a pay cut of 15 and 20 percent. When the Workers' National Trade Union rejected this suggestion and counter-proposed a reduction of working hours, the NAF responded with a programme of lockouts. During the lockouts, two companies, Norsk Hydro and Norske Skog Union, chose to allow some contract workers to perform some work. This was perceived as strikebreaking and led to an escalation of the conflict level.

It was an angry mood in which the Secretary of the Labor party (and later Prime Minister) Einar Gerhardsen called strikebreakers "skabbdyr" (scabs) and director of Norsk Hydro Bjarne Eriksen described the dispute as being one between Labour and the community. In the afternoon of 8 June 2,000 workers marched to the Norsk Hydro trans-shipment port and warehouse at Menstad, where 100 police officers guarded the contract workers.

The brief "battle", between police and strikers, saw law-and-order forces overwhelmed by demonstrators, who threw stones and iron piping before the protesters retreated. The government response (passed on by Minister of Defence, Vidkun Quisling) was to send the army into the province with the stated aim of protecting nearby weapons depots. Although there was no further incident and law and order in the area was duly restored, the government response was heavily criticised by the Communist party, who had led the original demonstrations.

See also 
 Ådalen shootings

References 

1931 riots
1931 in Norway
June 1931 events